Alépé is a town in south-eastern Ivory Coast. It is a sub-prefecture of and the seat of Alépé Department in La Mé Region, Lagunes District. Alépé is also  a commune.

References

Sub-prefectures of La Mé
Communes of La Mé